Rod Burton is a British singer, songwriter, actor, musician and entertainer. He is best known for being part of the trio Rod, Jane and Freddy along with their appearences on the children's TV series Rainbow and their own series "Rod, Jane and Freddy" between 1980–1991.

Early life
Burton studied graphic design at the London College of Printing and started his career illustrating books. He left this field to pursue music. He spent several years 'busking' in the south of France and playing in pubs and bars until an audition with his then wife Jane got him a job on children's TV show Rainbow.

Career

Rainbow 
Burton formed part of Rod, Matt and Jane; a trio with Matthew Corbett and Jane Tucker. Their contribution to the show was to sing a song everyday invoking the theme of the day. Burton played banjo and guitar, Corbett played guitar and bass and Tucker played keyboards. When Corbett left in 1976, he was replaced by Roger Walker (the group became Rod, Jane and Roger). Walker was later replaced by Freddy Marks (making the group's name Rod, Jane and Freddy).

In 1979, Burton divorced Tucker, who entered a relationship with Marks in 1985 and married him in 2016.

Rod, Jane and Freddy Show

Towards the end of 1980, the trio were approached by ITV to do their own show. Plans went through, and The Rod, Jane and Freddy Show aired its first episode on 15 January 1981. Rod, Jane and Freddy appeared in both their own show and Rainbow until 1989, when they left Rainbow to focus solely on The Rod, Jane and Freddy Show.

Touring

In 1990, Burton toured with Jane and Freddy in their stage shows all across the country until 1996. In 1996, he won a Gold Badge Award from the British Academy of Songwriters, Composers and Authors.

Burton currently lives in London and is semi-retired, although he still writes songs.

References

External links

Rod, Jane and Freddy biography
Rod, Jane and Freddy songs
Official Episode List
Rod, Jane and Freddy Mini Website

English male television actors
English composers
Living people
1948 births